Parasitic drag, also known as profile drag, is a type of aerodynamic drag that acts on any object when the object is moving through a fluid. Parasitic drag is a combination of form drag and skin friction drag. It affects all objects regardless of whether they are capable of generating lift.

Total drag on an aircraft is made up of parasitic drag and lift-induced drag. Parasitic drag comprises all types of drag except lift-induced drag.

Form drag
Form drag arises because of the shape of the object. The general size and shape of the body are the most important factors in form drag; bodies with a larger presented cross-section will have a higher drag than thinner bodies; sleek ("streamlined") objects have lower form drag. Form drag follows the drag equation, meaning that it increases with the square of the velocity, and thus becomes more important for high-speed aircraft.

Form drag depends on the longitudinal section of the body. A prudent choice of body profile is essential for a low drag coefficient. Streamlines should be continuous, and separation of the boundary layer with its attendant vortices should be avoided.

Form drag includes interference drag, caused by the mixing of airflow streams. For example, where the wing and fuselage meet at the wing root, two airstreams merge into one. This mixing can cause eddy currents, turbulence, or restrict smooth airflow. Interference drag is greater when two surfaces meet at perpendicular angles, and can be minimised by the use of fairings.

Wave drag, also known as supersonic wave drag or compressibility drag, is a component of form drag caused by shock waves generated when an aircraft is moving at transonic and supersonic speeds.

Form drag is a type of pressure drag, a term which also includes lift-induced drag. Form drag is pressure drag due to separation.

Skin friction drag

Skin friction drag arises from the friction of the fluid against the "skin" of the object that is moving through it. Skin friction arises from the interaction between the fluid and the skin of the body, and is directly related to the wetted surface, the area of the surface of the body that is in contact with the fluid. Air in contact with a body will stick to the body's surface and that layer will tend to stick to the next layer of air and that in turn to further layers, hence the body is dragging some amount of air with it. The force required to drag an "attached" layer of air with the body is called skin friction drag. Skin friction drag imparts some momentum to a mass of air as it passes through it and that air applies a retarding force on the body. As with other components of parasitic drag, skin friction follows the drag equation and rises with the square of the velocity.

Skin friction is caused by viscous drag in the boundary layer around the object. The boundary layer at the front of the object is usually laminar and relatively thin, but becomes turbulent and thicker towards the rear. The position of the transition point from laminar to turbulent flow depends on the shape of the object. There are two ways to decrease friction drag: the first is to shape the moving body so that laminar flow is possible. The second method is to increase the length and decrease the cross-section of the moving object as much as practicable. To do so, a designer can consider the fineness ratio, which is the length of the aircraft divided by its diameter at the widest point (L/D). It is mostly kept  6:1 for subsonic flows. Increase in length increases Reynolds number. With  in the denominator for skin friction coefficient's relation, as its value is increased (in laminar range), total friction drag is reduced. While decrease in cross-sectional area decreases drag force on the body as the disturbance in air flow is less. For wings of an aircraft, a decrease in length (chord) of the wings will reduce "induced" drag though, if not the friction drag.

The skin friction coefficient, is defined by

where  is the local wall shear stress, and q is the free-stream dynamic pressure. For boundary layers without a pressure gradient in the x direction, it is related to the momentum thickness as

For comparison, the turbulent empirical relation known as the One-seventh Power Law'' (derived by Theodore von Kármán) is:

where  is the Reynolds number.

For a laminar flow over a plate, the skin friction coefficient can be determined using the formula:

See also
 NACA duct
 Jet engine ram drag
 Skin friction line

References

Drag (physics)